In the 1985–86 season Panathinaikos played for 27th consecutive time in Greece's top division, the Alpha Ethniki. They also competed in the UEFA Cup and the Greek Cup.

Squad

Competitions

Alpha Ethniki

Classification

Greek Cup

Final
The 44th Greek Cup Final was played at the Athens Olympic Stadium "Spyridon Louis".

References

External links
 Panathinaikos FC official website

Panathinaikos F.C. seasons
Panathinaikos
Greek football championship-winning seasons